The 2008–09 Serbian SuperLiga (known as the Jelen SuperLiga for sponsorship reasons) was the third since its establishment in 2006. It began on 16 August 2008 and ended on 30 May 2009. Partizan Belgrade successfully defended their title.

Team changes from 2007–08 
FK Bežanija were relegated to the Serbian First League after finishing in 12th place. Promoted from the First League were champions FK Javor Ivanjica and runners-up FK Jagodina.

FK Smederevo, having finished in 10th place, had to play a two-legged play-off against the fourth-placed team from the First League, FK Rad. Rad won 4–3 on aggregate and thus were promoted to the SuperLiga while Smederevo were also relegated.

FK Mladost Lučani declined their participation for the 2008–09 season due to financial problems on 2 July 2008. The spot left behind by Mladost was given to 11th placed (second to last) FK Banat Zrenjanin by the Serbian Football Association on the basis that the club has "better sponsors and more committed community support" than the other candidate for a free spot – FK Smederevo. This drew protests from FK Smederevo management who thought that their club has a better claim to stay in SuperLiga for the 2008–09 season based on their 2007–08 league finish. They even launched an official complaint with UEFA, but the answer they got was that UEFA stands by the Serbian Football Association's decision.

Future changes 
At the end of the 2007–08 season several SuperLiga clubs, most notably FK Bežanija, proposed an expansion of the league from 12 to 16 teams for 2008–09. The FSS board rejected that proposal. However, it was decided that the 2009–10 season will feature 16 teams. Only one team will be directly relegated, while five First League clubs will be directly promoted.

Stadia and locations

League table

Results 
The schedule consists of three rounds. During the first two rounds, each team played each other once home and away for a total of 22 matches. The pairings of the third round were then set according to the standings after the first two rounds, giving every team a third game against each opponent for a total of 33 games per team.

First and second round

Third round 
Key numbers for pairing determination (number marks position after 22 games):

Top scorers 

Source: superliga.rs

Hat-tricks

Awards

Player of the Year 
Nenad Milijaš and Almami Moreira both received the same number of votes therefore they both share the title as co-winners.

Team of the Year 
The All Star team was voted on at the end of the season by the 12 coaches of each SuperLiga team. Almami Moreira was the only player to receive all 12 votes.

Champion squad

References

External links 
 Official Site
 Tables and results at RSSSF

Serbian SuperLiga seasons
1
Serbia